Caroline Garcia was the defending champion, but lost in the semifinals to Daria Gavrilova.

Sixth-seeded Samantha Stosur won the title, defeating Gavrilova in the final, 5–7, 6–4, 6–3. This marked Stosur's ninth and final WTA singles title before her retirement in 2022.

Seeds

Draw

Finals

Top half

Bottom half

Qualifying

Seeds

Qualifiers

Lucky loser
  Çağla Büyükakçay

Draw

First qualifier

Second qualifier

Third qualifier

Fourth qualifier

Fifth qualifier

Sixth qualifier

References
Main Draw
Qualifying Draw

Internationaux de Strasbourgandnbsp;- Singles
2017 Singles
Internationaux de Strasbourg